The Embassy of Ukraine in Moscow was the chief diplomatic mission of Ukraine in the Russian Federation. It was located at 18 Leontyevsky Lane in Moscow.

In March 2014, as a result of the Annexation of Crimea by the Russian Federation, Ukraine recalled its ambassador and Ukraine was represented by its temporary chargé d'affaires until the start of the Russian invasion of Ukraine on 24 February 2022. Ukraine severed diplomatic relations with Russia and evacuated its entire embassy personnel from Moscow that day. The embassy's personnel were officially welcomed to the Latvian capital, Riga, on 4 March.

Ambassadors

1992–94Volodymyr Kryzhanivsky (Володимир Крижанівський)
1995–99Volodymyr G. Fedorov (Володимир Федоров)
1999–2005Mykola Biloblotsky (Микола Білоблоцький)
2005–06Leonid Osavolyuk (Леонід Осаволюк), Chargé d'Affaires ad interim
2006–08Oleh Dyomin (Олег Дьомін)
2008–10Kostyantyn Gryshchenko (Костянтин Грищенко)
2010–14Volodymyr Yelchenko (Володимир Єльченко)
2015–19Ruslan Nimchynskyy (Руслан Німчинський), Chargé d'Affaires ad interim
2019–22Vasyl Pokotylo (Василь Покотило), Chargé d'Affaires ad interim

In March 2014 Ukraine recalled its ambassador and Ukraine was represented by its temporary chargé d'affaires until 24 February 2022.

See also
Russia–Ukraine relations
Diplomatic missions in Russia
Diplomatic missions of Ukraine
Embassy of Russia in Kyiv

References

External links
 Embassy of Ukraine in Moscow

Ukraine
Moscow
Russia–Ukraine relations
Cultural heritage monuments of federal significance in Moscow